Kadam station is a railway halt in Sŏhŭng-dong, Tonghŭngsan-guyŏk, Hamhŭng city, South Hamgyŏng province, North Korea, on the Sinhŭng Line of the Korean State Railway.

History 
The station, originally called Hŭngsang station, was opened on 10 June 1923 by the Sinhŭng Railway as part of the  first section of its Hamnam Line between Hamhŭng and Oro. The Sinhŭng Railway was bought and absorbed by the Chosen Railway on 22 April 1938. The station received its current name after the establishment of the DPRK.

References

Railway stations in North Korea